Pühajärve is a village in Otepää Parish, Valga County in southern Estonia. It has a population of 182 (as of 7 February 2008).

Notable people
Ahti Kõo (born 1952), politician

See also
Pühajärv

References

Villages in Valga County
Tourist attractions in Valga County
Kreis Dorpat